Tom Erling Kårbø (born 4 February 1989 in Haugesund) is a Norwegian runner specialising in the 3000 metres steeplechase. He made the final at the 2018 European Championships finishing 11th.

His younger brother, Harald Kårbø, is also a runner on national level.

International competitions

Personal bests
Outdoor
800 metres – 1:52.82 (Oslo 2011)
1500 metres – 3:44.87 (Sollentuna 2018)
3000 metres – 8:02.49 (Bergen 2013)
5000 metres – 14:05.29 (Heusden-Zolder 2017)
10 kilometres – 29:34 (Lausanne 2015)
3000 metres steeplechase – 8:29.41 (Leiden 2018)	
Indoor
800 metres – 1:56.02 (Haugesund 2017)
1500 metres – 3:48.91 (Uppsala 2018)
One mile – 4:15.36 (Bemidji 2017)
3000 metres – 8:07.23 (Ghent 2013)
5000 metres – 15:00.47 (Mankato 2010)

References

1989 births
Living people
Norwegian male steeplechase runners
People from Haugesund
People from Stord
Sportspeople from Rogaland